Greek dialects may refer to:

Ancient Greek dialects
Varieties of Modern Greek